Richard James "JR" Castro is an American R&B singer-songwriter from Las Vegas, Nevada. Castro was originally a member of the Interscope/Zone 4 R&B act I-15, best known for their 2007 single, "Lost in Love". In 2015, he gained attention for his debut solo single "Get Home" featuring Kid Ink and Quavo.

Career

Career beginnings
Castro started his career as a member of I-15, an R&B trio. They gained attention with their 2007 single "Lost in Love", which was produced by Polow Da Don. In 2007 the group was featured on the single "Soulja Girl" by American rapper Soulja Boy. It peaked at number 32 on the US Billboard Hot 100.

2015–present: Songs You Were Made To and Sexpectations, Vol.1
In July 2015, Castro released his debut solo single "Get Home", which was produced by DJ Mustard and features guest appearances from American rappers Kid Ink and Quavo of Migos. An official music video for the single was released in October 2015. "Get Home" peaked at number 11 on the US Rhythmic chart and topped the Bubbling Under R&B/Hip-Hop Singles chart.

In February 2016, Castro premiered the music video for the Timbaland-produced single "FMN". While talking about how he met Timbaland, Castro said; "I met Timbaland in Vegas backstage one year at a Justin Timberlake concert in 2014. He heard my music going around the city, being in Vegas. At the time the music I had out was strictly in the city and he got a hold of it. He thought it was dope. It was a blessing for me as it was Timbaland." On August 22, 2016, Castro released his debut EP Songs You Were Made To, which features guest appearances from Poo Bear and Goldie. On October 13, 2017, he released his second EP titled Sexpectations, Vol.1.

Discography

EPs

Singles

As lead artist

As featured artist

Notes

References

External links
 
 

Year of birth missing (living people)
Living people
American contemporary R&B singers
Musicians from Las Vegas